Harpactea is a genus of  woodlouse hunting spiders that was first described by W. S. Bristowe in 1939. They are non-web building predators that forage on the ground and on tree trunks at night, mainly in xerothermic forests. During the day, they hide in silk retreats they build under rocks or bark.

H. sadistica was found to use traumatic insemination, the arthropod behavior of directly inserting its sperm into the body cavity of females. It is the first time it has ever been observed in spiders.

H. hombergi is the only member of its genus that occurs in Great Britain.

Description
Like all woodlouse hunters, Harpactea have six eyes. Males and females are similar, but the female has no epigyne.

Like the rest of their family, they are nocturnal. Unlike them, Harpactea do not specialize on hunting woodlice. H. rubicunda also hunts Drassodes and other spiders, but most Harpactea feed on insects in addition to woodlice.

Species
Almost all species of this genus appear to be endemic to small regions of the Mediterranean.  it contains 188 species from Europe and Northern Africa to Turkmenistan and Iran:

H. abantia (Simon, 1885) – Greece
H. achsuensis Dunin, 1991 – Azerbaijan
H. acuta Beladjal & Bosmans, 1997 – Algeria
H. aeoliensis Alicata, 1973 – Italy
H. agnolettii Brignoli, 1978 – Turkey
H. alanyana Özkütük, Elverici, Marusik & Kunt, 2015 – Turkey
H. albanica (Caporiacco, 1949) – Albania
H. alexandrae Lazarov, 2006 – Bulgaria, Romania, Ukraine, Russia (Europe)
H. algarvensis Ferrández, 1990 – Portugal
H. alicatai Brignoli, 1979 – Italy (Sardinia)
H. angustata (Lucas, 1846) – Algeria
H. antoni Bosmans, 2009 – Greece
H. apollinea Brignoli, 1979 – Greece
H. arguta (Simon, 1907) – France, Italy
H. armenica Dunin, 1989 – Armenia
H. arnedoi Kunt, Elverici, Özkütük & Yağmur, 2011 – Turkey
H. asparuhi Lazarov, 2008 – Bulgaria
H. auresensis Bosmans & Beladjal, 1991 – Algeria
H. auriga (Simon, 1911) – Algeria
H. aurigoides Bosmans & Beladjal, 1991 – Algeria
H. azerbajdzhanica Dunin, 1991 – Azerbaijan
H. azowensis Charitonov, 1956 – Ukraine, Russia (Europe)
H. babori (Nosek, 1905) – Bulgaria, Greece, Turkey
H. ballarini Kunt, Özkütük & Elverici, 2013 – Turkey
H. blasi Ribera & Ferrández, 1986 – Spain
H. brachati Wunderlich, 2020 – Turkey
H. buchari Dunin, 1991 – Azerbaijan
H. bulgarica Lazarov & Naumova, 2010 – Macedonia, Bulgaria
H. caligata Beladjal & Bosmans, 1997 – Algeria
H. carusoi Alicata, 1974 – Italy, Tunisia
H. catholica (Brignoli, 1984) – Greece (Crete)
H. caucasia (Kulczyński, 1895) – Russia (Caucasus), Georgia
H. cecconii (Kulczyński, 1908) – Cyprus
H. cesari Van Keer, 2009 – Greece
H. chreensis Bosmans & Beladjal, 1989 – Algeria
H. christae Bosmans & Beladjal, 1991 – Algeria
H. christodeltshevi Bayram, Kunt & Yağmur, 2009 – Turkey
H. clementi Bosmans, 2009 – Greece, Turkey
H. coccifera Brignoli, 1984 – Greece (Crete)
H. colchidis Brignoli, 1978 – Turkey
H. complicata Deltshev, 2011 – Serbia
H. corinthia Brignoli, 1984 – Greece
H. corticalis (Simon, 1882) – France, Italy
H. cressa Brignoli, 1984 – Greece (Crete)
H. cruriformis Bosmans, 2011 – Greece
H. damini Pavlek & Arnedo, 2020 – Croatia
H. dashdamirovi Dunin, 1993 – Azerbaijan
H. decebali Nae, 2021 – Romania
H. deelemanae Dunin, 1989 – Armenia
H. deltshevi Dimitrov & Lazarov, 1999 – Bulgaria
H. digiovannii Gasparo, 2014 – Greece
H. diraoi Brignoli, 1978 – Turkey
H. dobati Alicata, 1974 – Turkey
H. doblikae (Thorell, 1875) – Ukraine (mainland, Crimea)
H. dufouri (Thorell, 1873) – Spain
H. dumonti Bosmans & Beladjal, 1991 – Algeria
H. eskovi Dunin, 1989 – Georgia, Armenia
H. fageli Brignoli, 1980 – Portugal, Spain
H. forceps Varol & Danışman, 2018 – Turkey
H. forcipifera (Simon, 1911) – Algeria
H. gaditana Pesarini, 1988 – Spain
H. galatica Brignoli, 1978 – Turkey
H. gennargentu Wunderlich, 1995 – Italy (Sardinia)
H. globifera (Simon, 1911) – Algeria
H. gobustanica (Nuruyeva & Huseynov, 2022) – Azerbaijan
H. golovatchi Dunin, 1989 – Armenia
H. gridellii (Caporiacco, 1951) – Italy
H. grisea (Canestrini, 1868) – Switzerland, Austria, Italy, Slovenia
H. gunselorum Gücel, Fuller, Göçmen & Kunt, 2018 – Cyprus
H. hauseri Brignoli, 1976 – Greece
H. heizerensis Bosmans & Beladjal, 1991 – Algeria
H. heliconia Brignoli, 1984 – Greece
H. henschi (Kulczyński, 1915) – Bosnia-Hercegovina
H. herodis Brignoli, 1978 – Israel
H. hispana (Simon, 1882) – Spain, France
H. hombergi (Scopoli, 1763) (type) – Europe
H. hyrcanica Dunin, 1991 – Azerbaijan
H. ice Komnenov & Chatzaki, 2016 – Greece
H. incerta Brignoli, 1979 – Greece
H. incurvata Bosmans & Beladjal, 1991 – Algeria
H. indistincta Dunin, 1991 – Russia (Caucasus), Azerbaijan
H. innupta Beladjal & Bosmans, 1997 – Algeria
H. isaurica Brignoli, 1978 – Turkey
H. johannitica Brignoli, 1976 – Greece
H. kalaensis Beladjal & Bosmans, 1997 – Algeria
H. kalavachiana Gücel, Charalambidou, Göçmen & Kunt, 2019 – Cyprus
H. karabachica Dunin, 1991 – Azerbaijan
H. karaschkhan Kunt, Özkütük, Elverici, Marusik & Karakaş, 2016 – Turkey
H. kareli Bosmans & Beladjal, 1991 – Algeria
H. kencei Kunt, Elverici, Özkütük & Yağmur, 2011 – Turkey
H. konradi Lazarov, 2009 – Bulgaria
H. korgei Brignoli, 1979 – Turkey
H. krueperi (Simon, 1885) – Greece
H. krumi Lazarov, 2010 – Bulgaria
H. kubrati Lazarov, 2008 – Bulgaria
H. kulczynskii Brignoli, 1976 – Greece
H. lazarovi Deltshev, 2011 – Bulgaria
H. lazonum Brignoli, 1978 – Turkey
H. lepida (C. L. Koch, 1838) – Europe
H. loebli Brignoli, 1974 – Greece
H. logunovi Dunin, 1992 – Russia (Caucasus), Georgia
H. longitarsa Alicata, 1974 – Algeria, Tunisia
H. longobarda Pesarini, 2001 – Spain (Balearic Is.), Italy, Ukraine
H. maelfaiti Beladjal & Bosmans, 1997 – Algeria
H. magnibulbi Machado & Ferrández, 1991 – Portugal
H. major (Simon, 1911) – Algeria
H. mariae Komnenov, 2014 – Macedonia
H. martensi Dunin, 1991 – Azerbaijan
H. mateparlovi Pavlek & Arnedo, 2020 – Croatia
H. mcheidzeae Dunin, 1992 – Georgia
H. medeae Brignoli, 1978 – Turkey
H. mehennii Bosmans & Beladjal, 1989 – Algeria
H. mentor Lazarov & Naumova, 2010 – Bulgaria
H. mertensi Bosmans & Beladjal, 1991 – Algeria
H. minoccii Ferrández, 1982 – Spain
H. minuta Alicata, 1974 – Tunisia
H. mithridatis Brignoli, 1979 – Turkey, Georgia
H. mitidjae Bosmans & Beladjal, 1991 – Algeria
H. modesta Dunin, 1991 – Russia (Caucasus), Azerbaijan
H. monicae Bosmans & Beladjal, 1991 – Algeria
H. mouzaiensis Bosmans & Beladjal, 1989 – Algeria
H. muscicola (Simon, 1882) – France (Corsica)
H. nachitschevanica Dunin, 1991 – Azerbaijan
H. nausicaae Brignoli, 1976 – Macedonia, Greece
H. nenilini Dunin, 1989 – Armenia
H. nuragica Alicata, 1966 – Italy (Sardinia)
H. oglasana Gasparo, 1992 – Italy
H. oranensis Bosmans & Beladjal, 1991 – Algeria
H. ortegai Ribera & De Mas, 2003 – Spain
H. osellai Brignoli, 1978 – Turkey
H. ouarsenensis Bosmans & Beladjal, 1991 – Algeria
H. ovata Beladjal & Bosmans, 1997 – Algeria
H. paradoxa Dunin, 1992 – Georgia
H. parthica Brignoli, 1980 – Iran, Turkmenistan?
H. persephone Gasparo, 2011 – Greece (Crete)
H. petrovi Lazarov & Dimitrov, 2018 – Bulgaria
H. piligera (Thorell, 1875) – Italy
H. pisidica Brignoli, 1978 – Turkey
H. popovi Dimitrov, Deltshev & Lazarov, 2019 – Bulgaria
H. proxima Ferrández, 1990 – Portugal
H. pugio Varol & Akpınar, 2016 – Turkey
H. punica Alicata, 1974 – Algeria, Tunisia
H. reniformis Beladjal & Bosmans, 1997 – Algeria
H. rubicunda (C. L. Koch, 1838) – Europe, Georgia
H. rucnerorum Polenec & Thaler, 1975 – Croatia
H. ruffoi Alicata, 1974 – Tunisia
H. rugichelis Denis, 1955 – Lebanon
H. sadistica Řezáč, 2008 – Israel
H. saeva (Herman, 1879) – Slovakia, Hungary, south-eastern Europe to Ukraine
H. salvatorei Platania & Arnedo, 2020 – Italy
H. samuili Lazarov, 2006 – North Macedonia, Bulgaria, Greece
H. sanctaeinsulae Brignoli, 1978 – Turkey
H. sanctidomini Gasparo, 1997 – Italy
H. sardoa Alicata, 1966 – Italy
H. sbordonii Brignoli, 1978 – Turkey
H. sciakyi Pesarini, 1988 – Spain
H. secunda Dunin, 1989 – Armenia
H. senalbensis Beladjal & Bosmans, 1997 – Algeria
H. serena (Simon, 1907) – Spain, France
H. sicula Alicata, 1966 – Italy (Sicily), Malta
H. simovi Deltshev & Lazarov, 2018 – Bulgaria
H. sinuata Beladjal & Bosmans, 1997 – Algeria
H. spasskyi Dunin, 1992 – Ukraine (Crimea), Russia (Caucasus)
H. spirembolus Russell-Smith, 2011 – Greece
H. srednagora Dimitrov & Lazarov, 1999 – Macedonia, Bulgaria
H. stalitoides Ribera, 1993 – Portugal
H. stoevi Deltshev & Lazarov, 2018 – Bulgaria
H. strandi (Caporiacco, 1939) – Italy
H. strandjica Dimitrov, 1997 – Bulgaria, Turkey
H. strinatii Brignoli, 1979 – Greece
H. sturanyi (Nosek, 1905) – Greece, Turkey, Georgia
H. subiasi Ferrández, 1990 – Portugal
H. talyschica Dunin, 1991 – Azerbaijan
H. tavirensis Wunderlich, 2020 – Portugal
H. tenuiemboli Deltshev, 2011 – Serbia
H. tergestina Gasparo, 2014 – Italy
H. terveli Lazarov, 2009 – Bulgaria, Turkey
H. thaleri Alicata, 1966 – Switzerland, Italy
H. undosa Beladjal & Bosmans, 1997 – Algeria
H. vagabunda Dunin, 1991 – Azerbaijan
H. vignai Brignoli, 1978 – Turkey
H. villehardouini Brignoli, 1979 – Greece
H. wolfgangi Komnenov & Chatzaki, 2016 – Greece
H. yakourensis Beladjal & Bosmans, 1997 – Algeria
H. zaitzevi Charitonov, 1956 – Georgia, Azerbaijan, Armenia
H. zannonensis Alicata, 1966 – Italy
H. zjuzini Dunin, 1991 – Azerbaijan
H. zoiai Gasparo, 1999 – Greece

References

Further reading

External links
 BBC News (April 30, 2009): Spider sex violent but effective
 YouTube: Mating of H. sadistica: Video
 Uni Bonn: Diagnostic photographs of Harpactea
 The Essex Field Club: Picture of H. rubicunda
 Picture of H. hombergi

Araneomorphae genera
Dysderidae
Spiders of Africa
Spiders of Asia